The W. Kerr Scott Dam and Reservoir is a  artificial lake impounded by a dam located in Wilkes County, North Carolina. It is located on the Yadkin River system, and is operated and managed by the U.S. Army Corps of Engineers.

Recreation
The lake is open to the public for recreational fishing and boating. It is particularly noted for its excellent bass fishing.

History
Scott Dam was completed in 1962 to control flooding that had frequently been a problem in the area. It was named for W. Kerr Scott, the 62nd Governor of North Carolina, who played a key role in the project. The lake has a shoreline of 56 miles.

References

Buildings and structures in Wilkes County, North Carolina
Dams in North Carolina
Reservoirs in North Carolina
Bodies of water of Wilkes County, North Carolina